Lisdexamfetamine, sold under the brand name Vyvanse among others, is a stimulant medication that is mainly used to treat attention deficit hyperactivity disorder (ADHD) in people over the age of five as well as moderate-to-severe binge eating disorder in adults. Lisdexamfetamine is taken by mouth. Its effects generally begin within two hours and last for up to 14 hours. In the United Kingdom, it is usually less preferred than methylphenidate for the treatment of children.

Common side effects of lisdexamfetamine include loss of appetite, anxiety, diarrhea, trouble sleeping, irritability, and nausea. Rare but serious side effects include mania, sudden cardiac death in those with underlying heart problems, and psychosis. It has a high potential for substance abuse per the Drug Enforcement Administration  (DEA). Serotonin syndrome may occur if used with certain other medications. Its use during pregnancy may result in harm to the baby and use during breastfeeding is not recommended by the manufacturer.

Lisdexamfetamine is an inactive prodrug that works after being converted by the body into dextroamphetamine, a central nervous system (CNS) stimulant. Chemically, lisdexamfetamine is composed of the amino acid L-lysine, attached to dextroamphetamine.

Lisdexamfetamine was approved for medical use in the United States in 2007. In 2020, it was the 85th most commonly prescribed medication in the United States, with more than 8million prescriptions. It is a Class B controlled substance in the United Kingdom and a Schedule II controlled substance in the United States.

Uses

Medical

Lisdexamfetamine is used primarily as a treatment for attention deficit hyperactivity disorder (ADHD) and binge eating disorder; it has similar  uses as those of other pharmaceutical amphetamines. Individuals over the age of 65 were not commonly tested in clinical trials of lisdexamfetamine for ADHD.

Enhancing performance

Available forms
Lisdexamfetamine is available as the dimesylate salt in the form of both oral capsules and chewable tablets. The capsules are available in doses of 10, 20, 30, 40, 50, 60, and 70 mg, while the chewable tablets are available in doses of 10, 20, 30, 40, 50, and 60 mg. These amounts of lisdexamfetamine dimesylate are equivalent to 5.8, 11.6, 17.3, 23.1, 28.9, 34.7, and 40.5 mg lisdexamfetamine free-base, respectively. A dose of 50 mg of lisdexamfetamine dimesylate is approximately equimolar to a 20 mg dose of dextroamphetamine sulfate or to 15 mg dextroamphetamine free-base in terms of the amount of dextroamphetamine contained. Lisdexamfetamine capsules can be swallowed intact, or they can be opened and mixed into water, yogurt, or applesauce and consumed in that manner.

Contraindications
Pharmaceutical lisdexamfetamine is contraindicated in patients with hypersensitivity to amphetamine products or any of the formulation's inactive ingredients. It is also contraindicated in patients who have used a monoamine oxidase inhibitor (MAOI) within the last 14 days. Amphetamine products are contraindicated by the United States Food and Drug Administration (USFDA) in people with a history of drug abuse, heart disease, or severe agitation or anxiety, or in those currently experiencing arteriosclerosis, glaucoma,  hyperthyroidism, or severe hypertension. However, a European consensus statement on adult ADHD noted that stimulants do not worsen substance misuse in adults with ADHD and comorbid substance use disorder and should not be avoided in these individuals. In any case, the statement noted that immediate-release stimulants should be avoided in those with both ADHD and substance use disorder and that slower-release stimulant formulations like  methylphenidate (Concerta) and lisdexamfetamine should be preferred due to their lower misuse potential. Prescribing information approved by the Australian Therapeutic Goods Administration further contraindicates anorexia.

Adverse effects
Products containing lisdexamfetamine have a comparable drug safety profile to those containing amphetamine. The major side effects of lisdexamfetamine in short-term clinical trials (≥5% incidence) have included decreased appetite, insomnia, dry mouth, weight loss, irritability, upper abdominal pain, nausea, vomiting, diarrhea, constipation, increased heart rate, anxiety, dizziness, and feeling jittery. Rates of side effects may vary in adults, adolescents, and children. Rare but serious side effects of lisdexamfetamine may include mania, sudden cardiac death in those with underlying heart problems, stimulant psychosis, and serotonin syndrome.

Interactions 

 Acidifying agents: Drugs that acidify the urine, such as ascorbic acid, increase urinary excretion of dextroamphetamine, thus decreasing the half-life of dextroamphetamine in the body.
 Alkalinizing agents: Drugs that alkalinize the urine, such as sodium bicarbonate, decrease urinary excretion of dextroamphetamine, thus increasing the half-life of dextroamphetamine in the body.
 CYP2D6 inhibitors: Hydroxylation via the cytochrome P450 enzyme CYP2D6 is the major pathway of metabolism of dextroamphetamine. Potent CYP2D6 inhibitors, such as paroxetine, fluoxetine, bupropion, and duloxetine, among others, may inhibit the metabolism of dextroamphetamine and thereby increase exposure to it. Studies characterizing this potential interaction are currently lacking. Concomitant use of lisdexamfetamine with CYP2D6 inhibitors may increase the risk of serotonin syndrome due to greater drug exposure according to the FDA label for lisdexamfetamine.
 Monoamine oxidase inhibitors: Concomitant use of MAOIs and central nervous system stimulants such as lisdexamfetamine can cause a hypertensive crisis.

Pharmacology

Mechanism of action

Lisdexamfetamine is an inactive prodrug that is converted in the body to dextroamphetamine, a pharmacologically active compound which is responsible for the drug's activity. After oral ingestion, lisdexamfetamine is broken down by enzymes in red blood cells to form L-lysine, a naturally occurring essential amino acid, and dextroamphetamine. The conversion of lisdexamfetamine to dextroamphetamine is not affected by gastrointestinal pH and is unlikely to be affected by alterations in normal gastrointestinal transit times.

The optical isomers of amphetamine, i.e., dextroamphetamine and levoamphetamine, are TAAR1 agonists and vesicular monoamine transporter 2 inhibitors that can enter monoamine neurons; this allows them to release monoamine neurotransmitters (dopamine, norepinephrine, and serotonin, among others) from their storage sites in the presynaptic neuron, as well as prevent the reuptake of these neurotransmitters from the synaptic cleft.

Lisdexamfetamine was developed with the goal of providing a long duration of effect that is consistent throughout the day, with reduced potential for abuse. The attachment of the amino acid lysine slows down the relative amount of dextroamphetamine available to the blood stream. Because no free dextroamphetamine is present in lisdexamfetamine capsules, dextroamphetamine does not become available through mechanical manipulation, such as crushing or simple extraction. A relatively sophisticated biochemical process is needed to produce dextroamphetamine from lisdexamfetamine. As opposed to Adderall, which contains roughly equal parts of racemic amphetamine and dextroamphetamine salts, lisdexamfetamine is a single-enantiomer dextroamphetamine formula. Studies conducted show that lisdexamfetamine dimesylate may have less abuse potential than dextroamphetamine and an abuse profile similar to diethylpropion at dosages that are FDA-approved for treatment of ADHD, but still has a high abuse potential when this dosage is exceeded by over 100%.

Pharmacokinetics

Chemistry
Lisdexamfetamine is a substituted amphetamine with an amide linkage formed by the condensation of dextroamphetamine with the carboxylate group of the essential amino acid L-lysine. The reaction occurs with retention of stereochemistry, so the product lisdexamfetamine exists as a single stereoisomer. The condensation reaction occurs with loss of water:

(S)-   +   (S)-   →   (S,S)-   +   

Amine functional groups are vulnerable to oxidation in air and so pharmaceuticals containing them are usually formulated as salts where this moiety has been protonated.  This increases stability, water solubility, and, by converting a molecular compound to an ionic compound, increases the melting point and thereby ensures a solid product.  In the case of lisdexamfetamine, this is achieved by reacting with two equivalents of methanesulfonic acid to produce the dimesylate salt, a water-soluble (792 mg mL−1) powder with a white to off-white color.

   +   2    →

Comparison to other formulations
Lisdexamfetamine dimesylate is one marketed formulation delivering dextroamphetamine. The following table compares the drug to other amphetamine pharmaceuticals.

History 

Lisdexamfetamine was developed by New River Pharmaceuticals, who were bought by Takeda Pharmaceuticals through its acquisition of Shire Pharmaceuticals, shortly before it began being marketed. It was developed with the intention of creating a longer-lasting and less-easily abused version of dextroamphetamine, as the requirement of conversion into dextroamphetamine via enzymes in the red blood cells delays its onset of action, regardless of the route of administration.

On 23 April 2008, the FDA approved lisdexamfetamine for treatment of ADHD in adults. On 4 August 2009, Health Canada approved the marketing of 30 mg and 50 mg capsules of lisdexamfetamine for prescription use.

In January 2015, lisdexamfetamine was approved by the US Food and Drug Administration for treatment of binge eating disorder in adults.

The US Food and Drug Administration gave tentative approval to generic formulations of lisdexamfetamine in 2015. The expiration date for patent protection of lisdexamfetamine in the US was 24 February 2023.

Production quotas for 2016 in the United States were 29,750 kg.

Society and culture

Names

Lisdexamfetamine is the International Nonproprietary Name (INN) and is a contraction of L-lysine-dextroamphetamine.

As of November 2020, lisdexamfetamine is sold under the following brand names: Aduvanz, Elvanse, Juneve, Lisdexamfetamine Dimesylate, Samexid, Tyvense, Venvanse, and Vyvanse.

Research

Depression
Some clinical trials that used lisdexamfetamine as an add-on therapy with a selective serotonin reuptake inhibitor (SSRI) or serotonin-norepinephrine reuptake inhibitor (SNRI) for treatment-resistant depression indicated that this is no more effective than the use of an SSRI or SNRI alone. Other studies indicated that psychostimulants potentiated antidepressants, and were under-prescribed for treatment resistant depression. In those studies, patients showed significant improvement in energy, mood, and psychomotor activity. Clinical guidelines advise caution in the use of stimulants for depression and advise them only as second- or third-line adjunctive agents.

In February 2014, Shire announced that two late-stage clinical trials had found that Vyvanse was not an effective treatment for depression, and development for this indication was discontinued. A 2018 meta-analysis of randomized controlled trials of lisdexamfetamine for antidepressant augmentation in people with major depressive disorder—the first to be conducted—found that lisdexamfetamine was not significantly better than placebo in improving Montgomery–Åsberg Depression Rating Scale scores, response rates, or remission rates. However, there was indication of a small effect in improving depressive symptoms that approached trend-level significance. Lisdexamfetamine was well-tolerated in the meta-analysis. The quantity of evidence was limited, with only four trials included. In a subsequent 2022 network meta-analysis, lisdexamfetamine was significantly effective as an antidepressant augmentation for treatment-resistant depression.

Although lisdexamfetamine has shown limited effectiveness in the treatment of depression in clinical trials, a phase II clinical study found that the addition of lisdexamfetamine to an antidepressant improved executive dysfunction in people with mild major depressive disorder but persisting executive dysfunction.

While development of lisdexamfetamine for major depressive disorder and bipolar depression was discontinued, the drug remains in phase II clinical trials for treatment of "mood disorders" as of October 2021.

Explanatory notes

Reference notes

References

External links 
 
 

Amphetamine
Anorectics
Aphrodisiacs
Codrugs
Drugs acting on the cardiovascular system
Drugs acting on the nervous system
Ergogenic aids
Euphoriants
Excitatory amino acid reuptake inhibitors
Nootropics
Norepinephrine-dopamine releasing agents
Phenethylamines
Stimulants
Substituted amphetamines
TAAR1 agonists
Takeda Pharmaceutical Company brands
Attention deficit hyperactivity disorder management
VMAT inhibitors
Wikipedia medicine articles ready to translate
World Anti-Doping Agency prohibited substances